Almazora is a Spanish surname. Notable people with the surname include:

Alfons Alzamora (born 1979), Spanish basketball player
Antonio Fas Alzamora (born 1948), Puerto Rican politician
Augusto Vargas Alzamora (1922-2000), Peruvian Cardinal Priest and Archbishop of Lima
Emilio Alzamora (born 1973), Spanish motorcycle racer
Lizardo Alzamora Porras (born 1928), Peruvian politician

Spanish-language surnames